Valea Grecului River may refer to:
 Valea Grecului, a tributary of the Dâmbovița in Argeș County, Romania
 Valea Grecului, a tributary of the Jidoștița in Mehedinți County, Romania
 Valea Grecului, a tributary of the Prahova in Prahova County, Romania